The 1992–93 Georgian Cup (also known as the David Kipiani Cup) was the forty-ninth season overall and third since independence of the Georgian annual football tournament.

Preliminary round 

|}

Round of 32 

|}

Round of 16 

|}

Quarterfinals 

|}

Semifinals 

|}

Final

See also 
 1992–93 Umaglesi Liga
 1992–93 Pirveli Liga

References

External links 
 The Rec.Sport.Soccer Statistics Foundation.

Georgian Cup seasons
Cup
Georgian Cup, 1992-93